The Diocese of Linares in Mexico is a Latin Church ecclesiastical territory or diocese of the Catholic Church in Mexico. The diocese is a suffragan in the ecclesiastical province of the metropolitan Archdiocese of Monterrey. It was erected on 30 April 1962. The cathedra is found in the Linares Cathedral in the episcopal see of Linares, Nuevo León.

Bishops
Anselmo Zarza Bernal (1962 -1966), appointed Bishop of León, Guanajuato
Antonio Sahagún López (1966 -1973), resigned and was appointed Auxiliary Bishop of Guadalajara, Jalisco
Rafael Gallardo García, O.S.A. (1974 -1987), appointed	Bishop of Tampico, Tamaulipas
Ramón Calderón Batres (1988 -2014)
Hilario González García (2014 -2020), appointed Bishop of Saltillo, Coahuila

External links and references

Linares
Linares, Roman Catholic Diocese of
Linares
Linares